Battleford was a federal electoral district in Saskatchewan, Canada, that was represented in the House of Commons of Canada from 1908 to 1925. This riding was created in 1907 following the admission of Saskatchewan into the Canadian Confederation in 1905 from parts of the Northwest Territories ridings of Assiniboia West, Calgary, Edmonton, Saskatchewan and Strathcona ridings.

It was abolished in 1924 when it was redistributed into Rosetown and South Battleford ridings.

Election results

See also 

 List of Canadian federal electoral districts
 Past Canadian electoral districts

External links 
 

Former federal electoral districts of Saskatchewan